Rape is a type of sexual assault initiated by one or more persons against another person without that person's consent. The act may be carried out by physical force, under threat or manipulation, by impersonation, or with a person who is incapable of giving valid consent.

Definitions of rape vary, but they generally require some degree of sexual penetration without consent. The term "consent" varies by law as well. Minors, for example, are often considered too young to consent to sexual relations with older persons (see statutory rape and age of consent). Consent is also considered invalid if obtained under duress, or from a person who does not have the ability to understand the nature of the act, due to factors such as young age, mental disability, or substance intoxication.

Many jurisdictions, such as Canada and several US and Australian states, no longer have a traditional common law offence of rape, which always required that sexual penetration had occurred. Some of these jurisdictions instead have created new statutory offences, such as sexual assault or criminal sexual conduct, which criminalise sexual contact without consent, and without any requirement that sexual intercourse occurred.

Terminology and definitions

Classification
Depending on the jurisdiction, rape may be characterized as a sexual offence or an offence against the person.
Rape may also be characterized as a form of aggravated assault or battery, or both, indecent assault or sexual assault or battery, or both.

Actus reus
To sustain a conviction, rape might require proof that the defendant had sexual penetration with another person. Depending on the jurisdiction, the actus reus of rape may consist of "having carnal knowledge of" a woman, or "having sexual intercourse with" a woman (including a girl) specifically, or either a woman or a man (including a girl or a boy) generally, or engaging in sexual intercourse with a person (which term includes an intersex person who might arguably be neither a woman nor a man) or having "sexual connection" with a person affected by penile penetration of that person's genitalia, or penile penetration of the vagina, anus or mouth (these terms construed as including surgically constructed organs) of a person.

In Prosecutor v. Anto Furundžija, the International Criminal Tribunal for the former Yugoslavia included fellatio in the definition of rape, because [para 183]: "The Trial Chamber holds that the forced penetration of the mouth by the male sexual organ constitutes a most humiliating and degrading attack upon human dignity. The essence of the whole corpus of international humanitarian law as well as human rights law lies in the protection of the human dignity of every person, whatever his or her gender."

Mens rea
Countries around the world differ in how they deal with the mens rea element in the law regarding rape, (i.e. the belief of the accused that the victim is not consenting or might not be consenting), and in how they place the onus of proof with regard to belief of consent.

For example, under the Sexual Offences Act 2003, the belief must be "reasonable" and "Whether a belief is reasonable is to be determined having regard to all the circumstances, including any steps A has taken to ascertain whether B consents."

In some jurisdictions the mens rea is quite complex, such as in New South Wales, where the law reads:

The Explanatory Report of the Istanbul Convention, states at para 189: "The interpretation of the word 'intentionally' is left to domestic law, but the requirement for intentional conduct relates to all the elements of the offence." [in regard to Article 36 of the convention – Sexual violence, including rape].

Attendant circumstances

Rape has been defined so as to require proof that the sexual act in question was done without the victim's consent, or so as to require proof that it was done either without their consent or, alternatively, against their will.

There is not always a requirement that the victim did not consent. In the England and Wales, section 5 of the Sexual Offences Act 2003 creates the offence of "rape of a child under 13" and contains no reference to consent. After describing the sexual act the offence prohibits, the explanatory notes to the Act say "whether or not the child consented to this act is irrelevant."

In M. C. v. Bulgaria, the European Court of Human Rights ruled that the victim does not necessarily have to resist physically for the crime of rape to be committed [para 166]:

Some circumstances, such as where the victim is kidnapped or in detention, or under conditions of war or genocide, may be viewed as so coercive, that they presume non-consent altogether; for example in ICTY, The Prosecutor v. Kunarac, Kovac and Vukovic, it was ruled, in regard to the rape during the Bosnian War, where women were kept in detention centers, under extremely harsh conditions, and were selected for sex by soldiers and policemen, that [para 132]: "Such detentions amount to circumstances that were so coercive as to negate any possibility of consent."

The issue arises in law as who can legally consent, for example with regard to persons who suffer from mental or physical disability. Although laws differ by jurisdiction, emerging international standards suggest that a person's mental or physical disability, should not, in and of itself, render the sexual interaction illegal, but rather the exploitation or abuse of such disability by the perpetrator should do so: in the European Union, the Directive 2011/93/EU of the European Parliament and of the Council of 13 December 2011 reads (with regard to the determination of legal consent of a child who is above the age of consent): "(10) Disability, by itself, does not automatically constitute an impossibility to consent to sexual relations. However, the abuse of the existence of such a disability in order to engage in sexual activities with a child should be criminalised."

Redefinitions and statute

General 

From the second part of the 20th century onwards, the crime of rape has undergone major changes in definition in many countries, especially in Western countries. It has evolved from its narrow traditional definition of forced penetration of a vagina by a penis, outside of marriage, to a broader definition, which includes forced sex in marriage (marital rape), and may also include other sexual acts (such as anal or oral sexual penetration); the latter were traditionally dealt with under sodomy laws. This redefinition of rape had the effect of defining male rape. There have also been changes in the legal definition of consent/coercion.

Two different changes have been made in recent decades in many jurisdictions in regard to the criminal offense of rape as it relates to marital status:

the criminalization of rape between spouses ('marital rape')
the removal of the stipulation that, if after the act of rape the victim and the perpetrator marry each other, the prosecution ends ('marry-your-rapist law')

Marital rape 

Throughout much of the history, rape in marriage was not a crime. Most cultures subscribed to the idea of the existence of 'conjugal rights' to sexual intercourse with one's spouse, and, until well into the 20th century, most legal systems generally accepted, overtly or tacitly, that such 'rights' could be taken by force, against the will of the wife. Traditional understanding and views of marriage, rape, sexuality, gender roles and self determination have started to be challenged in most Western countries during the 1960s and 1970s, which has led to the subsequent criminalization of marital rape during the following decades. With a few notable exceptions, it was during the past 30 years when most laws against marital rape have been enacted. Several countries in Eastern Europe and Scandinavia made spousal rape illegal before 1970, but other countries in Western Europe and the English-speaking Western World outlawed it much later, mostly in the 1980s and 1990s.

Marital rape is included in the 1993 Declaration on the Elimination of Violence Against Women as a form of violence against women, which reads:

It is also included in the Council of Europe Recommendation Rec(2002)5 of the Committee of Ministers to member states on the protection of women against violence, which reads:

In addition, the World Health Organization, defines sexual violence as: "any sexual act, attempt to obtain a sexual act, unwanted sexual comments or advances, or acts to traffic, or otherwise directed, against a person's sexuality using coercion, by any person regardless of their relationship to the victim, in any setting, including but not limited to home and work."

The countries which choose to ratify the Council of Europe Convention on preventing and combating violence against women and domestic violence, the first legally binding instrument in Europe in the field of violence against women, are bound by its provisions to ensure that non-consensual sexual acts committed against a spouse or partner are illegal. The convention came into force in August 2014.

Marry-your-rapist laws 

A marry-your-rapist law or rape-marriage law states that a rapist will not be prosecuted if they marry their victim. Although the terms for this phenomenon were only coined in the 2010s, the practice has been supported by the rape laws in many legal systems throughout history. In the late 20th and early 21st century, the remaining laws of this type were increasingly challenged and repealed in a series of countries.

As a crime of abduction 
Originally, in Ancient Rome, 'rape' was a crime-defining primarily the act of a male abducting a female without the consent of the man under whose authority she was (typically father or husband); sexual intercourse was not necessary. Furthermore, in many legal systems (such as 17th century France) the consent of the woman to sexual intercourse was not a defense – the act was still a crime if done without the consent of her father. While the laws on rape differed by historical period and culture, some elements were common to most jurisdictions until the second part of the 20th century (when rape laws underwent major changes): "rape" was a crime that could be committed only between parties who were not married to each other, and only by a male against a female.

Punishment

Punishment of assailants
Punishment for rape in most countries today is imprisonment. Castration is sometimes a punishment for rape and, controversially, some U.S. jurisdictions allow shorter sentences for sex criminals who agree to voluntary chemical castration.

In the past, rape was often punished with death, and it is punishable by death in at least nine countries today: China, Afghanistan, United Arab Emirates, Egypt, Iran, Saudi Arabia, Pakistan, and North Korea. In some of these instances, special circumstances apply. For example, rape is only punishable by death in India if the victim dies or is put in a persistent vegetative state, and/or if the rapist is a repeat offender, and in Iran, a death sentence for rape can be substituted with compensation, with or without imprisonment and flogging, if the victim so chooses.

In 1977, in Coker v. Georgia the Supreme Court of the United States held that the death penalty for the crime of rape of an adult woman was cruel and unusual punishment, and thus banned it as a violation of the Eighth Amendment to the United States Constitution. In 2008 in Kennedy v. Louisiana it ruled the same in regard to rape of a child.

Prison sentences for rape are not uniform. A study made by the U.S. Department of Justice of prison releases in 1992, involving about 80 percent of the prison population, found that the average sentence for convicted rapists was 9.8 years, while the actual time served was 5.4 years. This follows the typical pattern of violent crimes in the US, where those convicted typically serve no more than half of their sentence.

Between 2002 and 2003, more than one in ten convicted rapists in Victoria, Australia, served a wholly suspended sentence, and the average total effective sentence for rape was seven years. In the Republic of Ireland, the average sentence given for rape is 5–7 years.

Punishment of victims

Some societies punish the victims of rape as well as the perpetrators. According to such cultures, being raped dishonors the victim and, in many cases, the victim's family. In some countries (e.g. Libya, Afghanistan) rape victims are sometimes killed to restore honor to the family's name.

Certain cultures have historically promoted a system of honor, dishonor, and shame, which was applied with particular strictness to females. A victim of rape would be considered to have lost her honorable reputation and place in society, a loss of honor which entailed shame on the woman's family group as well. In early ancient Rome, ancient China, and other cultures, a pressure has existed which has led women to commit suicide after becoming victims of rape. In the Shakespeare drama Titus Andronicus, the title character kills his raped, maimed daughter in what he believes to be a mercy killing. Likewise, the suicide of female rape victims for reasons of shame is also historically documented in Chinese and Japanese culture.

In countries which outlaw fornication or adultery, rape victims may become subject to these laws (if they cannot prove the rape case and/or if it is revealed they were not virgins at the time of the assault – in the case of unmarried victims).

International guidelines, recommendations, and obligations

In recent years, there have been various guidelines and recommendations from international human rights organizations in regard to rape and sexual violence. One view that is advanced is that the offense of 'rape' should be replaced with a broader offense of "sexual assault." For instance, the Handbook for Legislation on Violence against Women from the UN Department of Economic and Social Affairs Division for the Advancement of Women gives these suggestions about legislation on sexual violence:

The Council of Europe Convention on preventing and combating violence against women and domestic violence, also known as the Istanbul Convention, which creates legally binding obligations for countries which choose to ratify it, reads:

Laws by country

Common law countries 
Rape was an offense under the common law of England. That offense became an offense under the law of other countries, including Australia and the United States, as a result of colonization or conquest, or the following cession (see British Empire).

Under this law, rape traditionally describes the act of a male forcing a female to have sexual intercourse (sexual penetration of the vagina by the penis) with him. Common law rape required the utmost physical resistance by the victim, as well as substantial force by the defendant. Until the late twentieth century, spousal rape was not considered a true rape case because both spouses were deemed to have consented to a lifelong sexual relationship through the wedding vows. However, with changes to the marital rape exemption, as well as with the significant development of women's rights, the belief of a marital right to force sexual intercourse has become less widely held.

Rape was also an offense at common law in Scotland. This offense was not derived from the English offense as Scotland retained its own system of criminal law under the terms of the Acts of Union 1707.

Bhutan 
Chapter 14 (Sexual Offenses) of the 2004 Penal Code of Bhutan outlaws rape and other sexual offenses.
Under the criminal code, there are several categories of rape, which are punished differently, depending on factors such as the age of the victim, the relationship between the victim and the perpetrator, the number of participants (gang rape), whether the victim was pregnant, whether injury occurred. Marital rape is also recognized as an offense under the 2004 laws, being classified as a petty misdemeanour. The most serious form of rape is gang rape of a child under twelve years of age, classified as a felony of the first degree.

The most serious sexual offense is gang rape of a child under 12.

Marital rape is illegal:

Canada 

The Criminal Code does not contain an offence of "rape," which historically required proof of penile penetration for a conviction. Instead, the law criminalizes "sexual assault," which is defined as sexual contact with another person without that other person's consent. The offence of sexual assault is broader than the historical offence of rape. Proof of penetration is not required to ground the offence of sexual assault, nor is the offence gender specific. Consent is defined in section 273.1(1) of the Criminal Code as "the voluntary agreement of the complainant to engage in the sexual activity in question."

France 
In the  any act of sexual penetration, whatever its nature, committed against another person or on the perpetrator, by violence, constraint, threat or surprise, is rape. Rape is punished by a maximum of fifteen years' criminal imprisonment.

Rape is punished by a maximum of twenty years' criminal imprisonment in certain aggravating factors (including victim under age of 15).

Rape is punished by a maximum of thirty years' criminal imprisonment where it caused the death of the victim.

Rape is punished by a maximum of imprisonment for life when it is preceded, accompanied or followed by torture or acts of barbarity.

Ireland 
In Republic of Ireland law, there are two separate offences of rape:
 "rape [at common law]," restricted to vaginal penetration by penis
"rape under section 4 [of the Criminal Law (Rape) (Amendment) Act 1990 as amended]," for anal or oral penetration by penis, or vaginal penetration by inanimate object

The offences have the same penalty, of life imprisonment, and the same provisions regarding conduct of trials, except that rape under section 4 is an alternative verdict in a rape trial, but not conversely.

The common law offence was codified by the Offences against the Person Act 1861 and the Criminal Law (Rape) Act 1981. A statutory definition was introduced by section 2(1) of the 1981 act; as amended it states:

The act also restricted reference to the alleged victim's past sexual history, and provided anonymity for both parties. Originally, the act referred to "unlawful sexual intercourse"; the word unlawful, intended to preserve the exemption for marital rape, was deleted by the 1990 act.

Section 4 of the 1990 act defines "rape under section 4" as follows:

By section 2 of the 1990 act,  "sexual assault" is defined in terms of "indecent assault," which is not otherwise defined. The 1988 Law Reform Commission (LRC) report on "rape and allied offences," on which the 1990 act was based, recommended expanding the common-law definition rather than creating a new offence, and the inclusion of penetration of the anus in the scope of section 4(b). The 1990 act mandated that trials for both rape offences be at the Central Criminal Court, removed the rule that males under 14 were considered incapable of sexual offences, and relaxed the obligation to warn the jury about an alleged victim's uncorroborated testimony. It also specifies that failure to offer resistance is not evidence of consent.

Greece 
Penal Code, Art. 336 par. 1 creates the offence of rape. It reads:

In 2019 a new paragraph was added (Art. 336 par. 5), practically making lack of consent the sole criterion for rape. It reads:

Marital rape was made illegal in 2006.

Guatemala 
The 2009 Law against Sexual Violence, Exploitation, and Trafficking in Persons defines rape as follows:

India 
In 2019, the Indian Supreme Court ruled that sex on a false promise of marriage constitutes rape.

Iran 
In Iran, the sentence for a rape case is death by hanging in public squares or prisons.

Israel 
In Israel, the definition of the criminal offence of rape is as follows:

New Zealand 
Rape is part of the statutory offence of sexual violation. Sexual violation is created by section 128 of the Crimes Act 1961.

Sexual violation is defined as follows:

Consent 
The mere fact that a person allows sexual connection to be performed on them, does not automatically mean that they are legally consenting. If that person allows sexual connection due to coercion (e.g., under force, threats or fear of force; when he/she is asleep or very intoxicated; if he/she is affected by an intellectual, mental, or physical condition or impairment of a certain nature and degree; when he/she is mistaken about the partner's identity), then he/she is not legally consenting.

Attempted sexual violation and assault with intent to commit sexual violation are also punished (Article 129).

Article 129A is entitled Sexual conduct with consent induced by certain threats and makes it illegal for a person to have sexual connection with another person or to do an indecent act on another person when the accused knows that the other person has been induced to consent to the connection/act by threat. However, a person is guilty of this crime "if (and only if) he or she knows that the other person has been induced to consent" to the sexual connection/indecent act "by an express or implied threat." Subsection (5), (a), (b), (c) of this article defines "threat" for the purpose of this article.

Article 135 outlaws Indecent assault. Article 138 outlaws Sexual exploitation of a person with a significant impairment.

Norway 

In Norway, rape is defined under the Norwegian Penal Code § 192 as either:
 engaging in sexual activity by means of violence or threatening behaviour,
 engaging in sexual activity with somebody who is unconscious or for any other reason incapable of resisting the act, or
 by means of violence or threatening behaviour compelling any person to engage in sexual activity with another person, or to carry out similar actions with him or herself.

When any of these circumstances occur, a person guilty of rape is punishable by up to 10 years imprisonment. However, if a person is guilty of rape through gross negligence he or she is liable to imprisonment for a period not exceeding five years.

If the activity in question was sexual intercourse or the offender has rendered a person unconscious or unable to resist the sexual activity, the penalty imposed shall be no less than three years imprisonment.

Further, the same section defines aggravated rape as a rape committed

The section recognizes sexually transmitted infections (defined in the Infection Protection Act) as grievous bodily harm.

Philippines 
Article 266-A of the Revised Penal Code (Title Eight of Act No. 3815) provides that:

Chapter 3 of this Code, which relates to rape, was inserted by the Anti-Rape Law of 1997. By section 2 of that Act, the crime of rape is classified as a crime against persons under that Code.

On March 3, 2022, Republic Act (RA) No. 11648 was signed and it changed the definition of rape into "By a person who shall have carnal knowledge of another person", effectively making male rape a crime.

Russia 
According to Article 131 of the Criminal Code of Russia, rape is defined as heterosexual vaginal intercourse using violence or threat of violence or if the victim is in a helpless state. The other forms of a violent sexual intercourse (male–male, female–male, female–female and non-vaginal male–female) are called "coercive sexual actions" and are punishable by Article 132. These two crimes, however, are punishable identically. Besides, such crimes as sexual relations with a person under the age of consent (16 years as of 2013, article 134) and depraved actions (Article 135), if committed against a person under 12 years since 2012 are considered rape or coercive sexual actions (depending on sex of the offender and the victim and the type of intercourse) and punished according to articles 131 or 132, because such victim is deemed to be in a helpless state due to his/her age. However, Article 134 punishes sexual activity between same-sex pairings more harshly than sexual activity between opposite-sex pairings when one of the persons is under 16 years old.

Rape or coercive sexual actions without any aggravating circumstances are punishable with 3 to 6 years of imprisonment. If the crime:
 was committed repeatedly (against one or more than one victim)
 was committed by a group of criminals
 was committed with a threat of murder or grievous harm to health
 was committed with particular cruelty (e.g. the criminal used violence that caused severe physical pain or the crime was committed in presence of relatives of the victim)
 caused an STD infection

then it is punishable with 4 to 10 years of imprisonment with possible subsequent restraint of liberty for up to 2 years (i.e. the criminal may not change or leave residence without permission and must register himself at local penal inspectorate 1 to 4 times a month; court may also impose additional restrictions such as the criminal may not leave home in certain hours, visit certain locations, change work without permission).

If the crime

 was committed against a person between 14 and 18 years
 caused grievous harm to health, HIV infection or other grievous consequences (e.g. suicide of the victim)

then it is punishable with 8 to 15 years of imprisonment with the subsequent mandatory restraint of liberty for up to 2 years and a possible ban on certain occupations or employment positions for up to 20 years.

If the crime

 caused the death of the victim by inadvertency
 was committed against a person under 14 years

then it is punishable with 12 to 20 years of imprisonment with the subsequent mandatory restraint of liberty for up to 2 years and a possible ban on certain occupations or employment positions for up to 20 years.

If the crime was committed against a person under 14 years by the criminal who had previously been sentenced for a sexual crime against a minor then it is punishable with 15 to 20 years of imprisonment with mandatory ban on certain occupations or employment positions for up to 20 years or with life imprisonment.

South Africa 
In South Africa, rape is defined by the Criminal Law (Sexual Offences and Related Matters) Amendment Act, 2007 (Act No. 32 of 2007). This act abolished the common law offence of rape and replaced it with a new expanded statutory offence of rape, applicable to all forms of sexual penetration without consent, irrespective of gender. Rape is defined in section 3 of the act as follows:

and "sexual penetration" is defined as:

The law also clarifies that marital rape is illegal; section 56 of the Act provides that:

Switzerland 
Rape is defined as follows:

Marital rape was made illegal in 1992, and since 2004 marital rape is prosecutable ex officio (meaning it can be prosecuted even if the wife does not complain).

Rape of a male is considered a heavy sexual assault/thread and is prosecuted under Art. 189 of the Swiss Penalty Code.

Trinidad and Tobago 
Rape under the law of Trinidad and Tobago is an indictable offence, created by section 4 of the Sexual Offenses Act:

Marital rape is also illegal; subsection (5) states: "(5) This section also applies to a husband in relation to the commission of the offence of rape on his wife."

United Kingdom

England and Wales 

Rape was formerly a common law offence, with a statutory penalty first given by the Offences against the Person Act 1861, and given a statutory definition by the Sexual Offences (Amendment) Act 1976. This has itself been superceded by the Sexual Offences Act 2003. Rape is currently defined, in section 1 of that act, as follows:

It follows that it is not possible for a person who does not have a penis to commit rape. (By general rules of statutory interpretation "words importing the masculine gender include the feminine," so the use of the male pronoun does not preclude a person who is legally recognized as female being convicted of rape.) Section 2 of that act defines assault by penetration:

Both are indictable offences carrying a maximum sentence of life imprisonment.

Rape by a woman (where it does not involve penetration of the victim) falls under the more general section 4, Causing a person to engage in sexual activity without consent, and/or section 3, Sexual assault (sexual touching without consent), both either way offences with a maximum sentence of 10 years' imprisonment.

Other sections create parallel offences where the victim is under 16 years of age; in these cases, consent is irrelevant.

Northern Ireland 

The law on sexual offences closely follows that of England. Rape is a statutory offence created by article 5 of the Sexual Offences (Northern Ireland) Order 2008 (S.I. 1769/2008 (N.I. 2)), which contains the same definition as in England. Likewise assault by penetration, sexual assault, causing a person to engage in sexual activity without consent, and child sex offences are copied from the Sexual Offences Act 2003.

Pursuant to article 5(5), any reference to rape in a statutory provision must be construed in accordance with article 5(1).

No person is liable in tort under the law of Northern Ireland on the ground only of having deprived another of the services of his female servant by raping her.

Scotland 

Rape is a statutory offence. It is created by section 1 of the Sexual Offences (Scotland) Act 2009. It is defined as follows:

Subsection (2) defines that "penetration" involves a penis.

Similarly to the English law, this act also creates various child sex offences in which consent is irrelevant if the victim is under 16. "Rape of a young child" under section 18 applies only if the child is under 13; otherwise it is "having intercourse with an older child."

History
Prior to the Sexual Offences (Scotland) Act 2009, rape in Scots law differed from the definition of rape in other legal systems. In Scotland, rape was defined as "a crime at common law which consisted of the carnal knowledge of a female by a male person without her consent." Under Scots law, rape could only be carried out by a male who penetrated a female's vagina. If a man's anus was penetrated by another man's penis, this was called sodomy and was tried under indecent assault, a form of aggravated assault. Likewise, if a male penetrated a female's anus by his penis without her consent, he would also be charged with indecent assault.

In Scotland, rape can only be prosecuted in the High Court of Justiciary and if convicted, the maximum penalty available to the court is life imprisonment. Evidence of distress can be used as corroborating evidence. Evidence of distress would be recognised by the first person or friend that the victim sees after the event. This should not be confused with hearsay evidence, which is not normally allowed to be led.

One of the key elements to prosecute a male for rape is to prove that the male had sexual intercourse without the female's consent. For sexual intercourse not to be rape, the active consent of the female is needed. This means it is not enough for a woman to be "passive;" she must actively consent. This was established by Lord Advocate's Reference (No. 1 of 2001). Therefore, a male could still be convicted of rape, even though the female did not say anything or show any resistance. This is a change in the law, as previously men who had sexual intercourse with sleeping women (as in the case of Charles Sweenie) or women who were unconscious due to voluntarily taking drugs or alcohol (see HMA v Logan) were charged with the lesser crime of indecent assault, rather than rape, as they had not used force to achieve penetration. Lord Advocate's Reference (No 1 of 2001), by requiring "active consent," had opened up the law to decide whether a voluntarily drunk or intoxicated woman can consent to sexual intercourse. This was clarified under the new laws of 2009 which state that sexual intercourse is non-consensual, and therefore considered rape if it occurs

Penetration is sufficient for a sexual intercourse to be deemed rape: there need not be any excretion of semen and the female's hymen does not have to be ruptured.

In Scotland, rape continued to be a gender-specific crime until the Sexual Offences (Scotland) Act 2009. This Act came into force on 1 December 2010. The Act expanded the definition of rape to include male rape.

The victims' commissioner for England and Wales, Dame Vera Baird, warned in 2020 that only 14 per cent of sexual violence victims report the assault to police. And even if sexual assault and rape are reported, prosecutions and convictions remain depressingly low. In Britain, only 1.6 per cent of rapes reported to the police result in a charge – a rate so low that Baird, has said that "we are witnessing the decriminalisation of rape."

United States

State laws 
There is no federal rape law in the United States, due to the United States v. Morrison ruling that parts of the Violence Against Women Act of 1994 were unconstitutional. Each state has its own laws concerning sexual aggression, some laws from the founding of the US and during the 1950s were based in racial discrimination against black people, in labelling consensual sex between a black man and white woman rape, and the fact that rape laws at the time did not apply when the victim was a black woman. There is also no national standard in the US for defining and reporting male–male or female-perpetrated rapes. State laws vary considerably, and in most states, the term "rape" is no longer used, and the offense has been replaced by crimes such as "sexual assault," "criminal sexual conduct," "sexual abuse," "sexual battery" etc. The US laws on sexual violence are complex, with states having numerous sex offenses, dealing with different situations. The laws on sex crimes have been changed and modernized significantly during the last decades and they continue to change.

Uniform Code of Military Justice 

Uniform Code of Military Justice [USC Title 10, Subtitle A, Chapter 47X, Section 920, Article 120] defines rape as:

Marital rape is banned; the law states: "Marriage is not a defense for any conduct in issue in any prosecution under this section."

Rape reporting 

According to the USA Today reporter Kevin Johnson, "no other major category of crime – not murder, assault or robbery – has generated a more serious challenge to the credibility of national crime statistics" as has the crime of rape. He says:

The FBI's report fails to report rapes with male victims, both adults and children, fails to report non-forcible rapes of either gender by either gender, and reflects only the number of rapes reported to police. The Justice Department's survey solicits information from people 12 and older, excluding the youngest victims of rape (and incest). However, by using a random national telephone survey of households, the National Crime Victimization Survey could pick up rapes unreported to the police. In addition, since both official reports collect rape data from states with widely divergent standards and definitions on what constitutes rape, uniform reporting is impossible.

In an attempt to improve the tracking of rape, the National Violence Against Women survey was first published in 1998 by the National Institute of Justice and the federal Centers for Disease Control and Prevention. Its authors acknowledged that they used different methodologies with relatively high margins of error. The 2000 report notes that "because annual rape victimization estimates (nationwide) are based on responses from only 24 women and 8 men (emphasis added) who reported being raped, they should be viewed with caution." It goes on to note that it fails to report rapes perpetrated against children, adolescents, the homeless, or people living in institutions, group facilities, or in households without telephones.

The 2006 report of the National Violence Against Women survey was based on the much larger sample size of 8,000 men and 8,000 women. It estimated that "17.7 million women and 2.8 million men in the United States were forcibly raped at some time in their lives, with 302,091 women and 92,748 men forcibly raped in the year preceding the survey." The report defines "rape" to include completed and attempted rapes. However, the vast majority of rapes were completed: "Among all respondents, 14.8 percent of the women and 2.1 percent of the men said they were victims of a completed rape at some time in their life, whereas 2.8 percent of the women and 0.9 percent of the men said they were victims of an attempted rape only."

In addition, many states define sexual crimes other than male-on-female penetration as sexual assault rather than rape. There are no national standards for defining and reporting male-on-male, female-on-female or female-on-male offenses, so such crimes are generally not included in rape statistics unless these statistics are compiled using information from states which count them as rape.

Rape statistics 

Rape crisis statistics can be found from the FBI and the Bureau of Justice as well as the CDC and RAINN (which uses the other resources as its source).

Notes

References